Newcastle New Bridge Street was a railway station on the edge of the city-centre of Newcastle-upon-Tyne, England. The station was the original Newcastle terminus of the Blyth and Tyne Railway, and was opened on 27 June 1864. In 1874 the Blyth & Tyne was taken over by the North Eastern Railway. Picton House, a villa designed by John Dobson, was used for company offices and passenger facilities.

In 1904 the line to Tynemouth was electrified (see Tyneside Electrics), and New Bridge Street temporarily became a terminus for the new electric service. The station was isolated, and had no connection to the lines towards Newcastle Central. In order to create a loop service (see North Tyneside Loop) New Bridge Street was closed to passengers in 1909, and a new link was built to nearby Manors North station, allowing trains to run through to Newcastle Central. Following this, New Bridge Street became a goods station, and remained open as such until 1967. Picton House was demolished in 1970.

Nothing now remains of the station, as the A167(M) road and a car park of Northumbria University have been constructed over the site.

References

New Bridge Street station - on disused-stations.org.uk

Disused railway stations in Tyne and Wear
Railway stations in Great Britain opened in 1864
Railway stations in Great Britain closed in 1909
Former North Eastern Railway (UK) stations